Committee of Safety may refer to:

Committee of Safety, the parliamentary body in England that oversaw the English Civil War.
Committee of safety (American Revolution), established throughout the Thirteen Colonies at the start of the American Revolutionary War.
Committee of Safety (Augusta County), one such Committee in Virginia.
Committee of Safety (Rowan County), drafted the Rowan Resolves.
Committee of Safety (Tryon County, New York), established in 1774.
Committee of Safety (Tryon County, North Carolina), issued the Tryon Resolves.
Committee of Public Safety, which controlled the French First Republic during the Reign of Terror.
Committee of Safety (Hawaii), the forerunner of the Provisional Government of Hawaii during the overthrow of the Hawaiian monarchy.

See also 
 Committee of Public Safety (disambiguation)
 Vigilance committee